William Carrier may refer to:

William Carrier (footballer), English footballer
William Carrier (ice hockey) (born 1994), Canadian ice hockey player